α-Melanocyte-stimulating hormone (α-MSH) is an endogenous peptide hormone and neuropeptide of the melanocortin family, with a tridecapeptide structure and the amino acid sequence Ac-Ser-Tyr-Ser-Met-Glu-His-Phe-Arg-Trp-Gly-Lys-Pro-Val-NH2. It is the most important of the melanocyte-stimulating hormones (MSHs) (also known as melanotropins) in stimulating melanogenesis, a process that in mammals (including humans) is responsible for pigmentation primarily of the hair and skin. It also plays a role in feeding behavior, energy homeostasis, sexual activity, and protection against ischemia and reperfusion injury.

α-MSH is a non-selective full agonist of the melanocortin receptors MC1 (Ki = 0.230 nM), MC3 (Ki = 31.5 nM), MC4 (Ki = 900 nM), and MC5 (Ki = 7160 nM), but not MC2 (which is exclusive for adrenocorticotropic hormone (ACTH)). Activation of the MC1 receptor is responsible for its effect on pigmentation, whereas its regulation of appetite, metabolism, and sexual behavior is mediated through both the MC3 and MC4 receptors.

It is generated as a proteolyic cleavage product from ACTH (1-13), which is in turn a cleavage product of proopiomelanocortin (POMC).

A few synthetic analogues of α-MSH have been investigated as medicinal drugs due to their photoprotective effects against ultraviolet (UV) radiation from the sun. They include afamelanotide (melanotan) and melanotan II, the former of which has been approved as a treatment to reduce photosensitivity in erythropoietic protoporphyria in the United States. Bremelanotide, another analogue of α-MSH, is available in the United States not as a photoprotective agent, but for the treatment of hypoactive sexual desire disorder in premenopausal women. All of these drugs have significantly greater potencies than α-MSH, along with improved pharmacokinetics and distinctive selectivity profiles.

See also
 β-Melanocyte-stimulating hormone
 γ-Melanocyte-stimulating hormone
 Adrenocorticotropic hormone

References

Human hormones
Melanocortin receptor agonists
Peptide hormones